Crisostomo or Crisóstomo (meaning "golden mouth" in Greek) is a given name and a surname. Notable people with the name include:
Crisostomo Arameo (died 1605), Roman Catholic prelate who served as Bishop of Ston (1585–1605)
Juan Crisóstomo Arriaga (1806–1826), Spanish Basque composer
Juan Crisóstomo Bonilla (1835–1884), Mexican general
Fely Crisóstomo, Filipina film director and actress
Ricci Crisostomo (born 1975), Filipino television and film actor from Marikina, Manila
Vanderson Gomes Crisóstomo (born 1986), Brazilian footballer
Vincent Crisostomo (born 1961), gay Asian American HIV AIDS activist of Chamorro descent from Guam
Juan Crisóstomo Falcón (1820–1870), President of Venezuela from 1863 to 1868
Crisóstomo Henríquez (1594–1632), Spanish Cistercian monk and scholar of church history who worked in the Spanish Netherlands
Crisostomo Ibarra, fictional protagonist in the novel Noli Me Tángere by José Rizal
Crisóstomo Martinez (1638–1694), Valencian painter and engraver known for his atlas of anatomy
Juan Crisóstomo Nieto, a Chachapoyas judge who brought the fortress of Kuelap to the attention of the world in the 1840s
João Crisóstomo de Amorim Pessoa (1810–1888), Portuguese bishop, Bishop of Santiago de Cabo Verde and archbishops of Goa and Braga
João Crisóstomo de Abreu e Sousa (1811–1895), army general who became the Prime Minister of Portugal 1890–1892
Juan Crisóstomo Torrico (1808–1875), President of Peru for a brief period in 1842
Crisostomo Yalung (born 1953), former Roman Catholic Bishop from the Philippines

See also
Ribeirão Crisóstomo, river of Mato Grosso state in western Brazil
San Giovanni Crisostomo a small church in the sestiere or neighborhood of Cannaregio, Venice
Teatro San Giovanni Crisostomo, opera house in Venice
Juan Crisóstomo Falcón National Park, also known as the Sierra de San Luis, in Falcón state, Venezuela
Chrysostome (disambiguation)
Chrysostomos (disambiguation)
Chrysostomus (disambiguation)